Portuguese Handball Super Cup (Portuguese: Supertaça de Portugal de Andebol) is a professional handball competition played between the winners of the Liga Portuguesa de Andebol and the winners of the Cup, or against the finalist of the Cup if the same team win both competitions.

In the 2012–13 season, it was played by the top 4 teams in the Liga Portuguesa de Andebol of the previous year.

Winners

Two-team format

Four-team format

Performance by club

See also 

Men's

 Andebol 1 
 Second Division 
 Third Division
 Taça de Portugal

  Youth Honors

Women's
 First Division
 Taça de Portugal
 Supertaça
  Youth Honors (Women)

Notes

References

Sup
1982 establishments in Portugal